Levinge may refer to:

Levinge Baronets
Richard Levinge: several, including
 Sir Richard Levinge, 1st Baronet (1656–1724) Speaker of the Irish House of Commons, also sat in the English House of Commons, and Commons of Great Britain
Sir Richard Levinge, 2nd Baronet (c1690–1748) Irish landowner and politician, MP for Westmeath 1723–27 and for Blessington 1727–48
 Richard Levinge (1724–1783), Irish politician, MP for Duleek 1768-76
 Sir Richard Levinge, 7th Baronet (1811–1884), Irish landowner and politician, MP for Westmeath 1857–65
Edward Levinge